Gul Tepe (Rose mound) is a Turkish place name and it may refer to:

Turkey 
 Gültepe, Aksaray, a village in the central district of Aksaray Province
 Gültepe, Kağıthane a neighbourhood in İstanbul
 A hill near Kestel, in the Bolkar Mountains, Turkey, with an ancient tin mine.

Iran 
 Gultepe, Zanjan, Iran

See also 

Gol Tappeh (disambiguation), places in Iran
Kültəpə, Azerbaijan
Kültepe, Turkey